Paul McMullan may refer to:
Paul McMullan (footballer, born 1984), Scottish footballer (Heart of Midlothian, Queen of the South, Raith Rovers, Hamilton Academical)
Paul McMullan (footballer, born 1996), Scottish footballer (Celtic and Dundee United)
Paul McMullan (journalist) (born 1963), British tabloid journalist with the News of the World newspaper

See also
Paul McMullen (1972–2021), American middle distance runner